Balleroy is a former commune in the Calvados department in the Normandy region of north-western France. On 1 January 2016, it was merged into the new commune of Balleroy-sur-Drôme.

The inhabitants of the commune are known as Biardais or Biardaises and Billards or Billardes.

Geography
Balleroy is located some 16 km south-west of Bayeux and 21 km north-east of Saint-Lô. Access to the commune is by the D13 road from Cerisy-la-Forêt in the west which passes through the village and continues east to Lingèvres. The D28 road goes south from the village to Planquery. The commune is mainly farmland with the Château de Balleroy grounds just west of the village occupying a substantial land area.

The river Drôme forms the western and north-western borders of the commune as it flows north-east to eventually join the ocean at Port-en-Bessin-Huppain. The Ruisseau de la Commune flows from the west to join the Drome in the commune. The Vesbire forms the south-eastern border of the commune as it flows south-west to join the Drôme.

History
Until 1521 the commune was the property of the lord of Aunay. The lordship of Balleroy was purchased by the Trextot family. Jean de Choisy, counselor, notary and secretary of the king, in turn bought the lordship of Balleroy as well as the lands of Cormolain, Montfiquet, and Vaubadon. He was the son of Jean de Choisy, intendant of Metz, knight, advisor to the king and the Duke of Orléans, Lord of Balleroy, Beaumont, Grandcamp, Léthanville, and Saint-Pierre and he founded the present chateau. He made the inhabitants near the chateau into vassals, forcing them to build their homes there.

In 1634 the Lord of Balleroy obtained the establishment of a weekly market (on Tuesday) and two fairs a year.

During the French revolutionary period of the National Convention (1792-1795), the commune was called Bal-sur-Drôme.

Heraldry

Administration

Balleroy was part of the Community of communes Intercom Balleroy Le Molay-Littry which included 22 communes and had its seat in Le Molay-Littry.

Balleroy was the seat of the former Canton of Balleroy. Since the 2015 French cantons reform, it is part of the canton of Trévières.

List of Successive Mayors

Twinning

Balleroy has twinning associations with:
 Shebbear (United Kingdom) since 1979.
 Ribe (Denmark) since 1986.
 Fo (Burkina Faso) since 1989.

Demography
In 2012 the commune had 985 inhabitants.

Culture and heritage

Civil heritage
The commune has two sites that are registered as historical monuments:
The Château de Balleroy (1626) was built by the architect François Mansart for Jean de Choisy, advisor to Louis XIII. Its French formal garden are by Henri Duchêne according to plans by André Le Nôtre. It remained in the Balleroy family until 1970. The village was built around the castle.
The Château de Balleroy Park (1626)

Chateau of Balleroy Picture Gallery

Religious heritage

The Parish Church of Saint-Martin Grounds (1650) are registered as an historical monument. The Church contains several items that are registered as historical objects:
A Framed Painting: The Alliance between Abimélek and Abraham (17th century)
A Framed Painting: The descendant of Abraham (17th century)
A Chalice with Paten (17th century)
A Statue: Virgin and child (17th century)
A Painting: The Annunciation (18th century)
An Episcopal Cross (18th century)
A Statue: Saint Martin (17th century)

Church of Saint Martin Picture Gallery

Activities and events
Each year a gathering of hot air balloons took place at the Château de Balleroy. This gathering took place for the last time in 1999 when Malcolm Forbes, the chateau's owner, would have celebrated his 80th birthday.

Since 2007 in the face of demand from the public, the festival was again held at the end of June but this no longer happens in the castle. This was held by the village festival committee who organized a small gathering. The festivities are now held above the village at the stadium.

Notable people linked to the commune

Louis Charles d'Hervilly (1756-1795), Count of Hervilly, knight, Marquis of Leschelles, married Marie Louise Augustine La Cour de Balleroy (1758-1830) on 7 October 1778 at the Château de Balleroy which was the Château for his wife's family.
Louis James, from an old Balleroy family (James from Lalande). He left to live in Auxerre (Yonne) where he founded the first modern department store in association with the local merchant Lesseré. As he was unmarried, he brought in a nephew (Achille) and niece (Hortense) to share in the very successful business: it was the time of "Bonheur des Dames" (Happiness of Women). The stores Soisson & James were transferred to Eurodif in 1970. 
Count Albert de Balleroy (1828-1872), MP for Calvados, painter specialising in hunting scenes, shared a studio on Rue Lavoisier in Paris with Édouard Manet
Malcolm Forbes (1919-1990), American press billionaire, owner of the Chateau from 1970.

See also
Communes of the Calvados department

References

External links
Balleroy official blog 
Balleroy on the 1750 Cassini Map

Former communes of Calvados (department)
Populated places disestablished in 2016